The Sydney Opera House is a multi-venue performing arts centre in Sydney. Located on the foreshore of Sydney Harbour, it is widely regarded as one of the world's most famous and distinctive buildings and a masterpiece of 20th-century architecture.

Designed by Danish architect Jørn Utzon, but completed by an Australian architectural team headed by Peter Hall, the building was formally opened by Queen Elizabeth II on 20 October 1973 after a gestation beginning with Utzon's 1957 selection as winner of an international design competition. The Government of New South Wales, led by the premier, Joseph Cahill, authorised work to begin in 1958 with Utzon directing construction. The government's decision to build Utzon's design is often overshadowed by circumstances that followed, including cost and scheduling overruns as well as the architect's ultimate resignation.

The building and its surrounds occupy the whole of Bennelong Point on Sydney Harbour, between Sydney Cove and Farm Cove, adjacent to the Sydney central business district and the Royal Botanic Gardens, and near to the Sydney Harbour Bridge.

The building comprises multiple performance venues, which together host well over 1,500 performances annually, attended by more than 1.2 million people. Performances are presented by numerous performing artists, including three resident companies: Opera Australia, the Sydney Theatre Company and the Sydney Symphony Orchestra. As one of the most popular visitor attractions in Australia, the site is visited by more than eight million people annually, and approximately 350,000 visitors take a guided tour of the building each year. The building is managed by the Sydney Opera House Trust, an agency of the New South Wales State Government.

On 28 June 2007, the Sydney Opera House became a UNESCO World Heritage Site, having been listed on the (now defunct) Register of the National Estate since 1980, the National Trust of Australia register since 1983, the City of Sydney Heritage Inventory since 2000, the New South Wales State Heritage Register since 2003, and the Australian National Heritage List since 2005. The Opera House was also a finalist in the New7Wonders of the World campaign list.

Description
The facility features a modern expressionist design, with a series of large precast concrete "shells", each composed of sections of a sphere of  radius, forming the roofs of the structure, set on a monumental podium. The highest roof point is 67 metres above sea-level which is the same height as that of a 22-storey building. The roof is made of 2,194 pre-cast concrete sections, which weigh up to 15 tonnes each.

Although the roof structures are commonly referred to as "shells" (as in this article), they are precast concrete panels supported by precast concrete ribs, not shells in a strictly structural sense. Though the shells appear uniformly white from a distance, they actually feature a subtle chevron pattern composed of 1,056,006 tiles in two colours: glossy white and matte cream. The tiles were manufactured by the Swedish company Höganäs AB which generally produced stoneware tiles for the paper-mill industry.

Apart from the tile of the shells and the glass curtain walls of the foyer spaces, the building's exterior is largely clad with aggregate panels composed of pink granite quarried at Tarana. Significant interior surface treatments also include off-form concrete, Australian white birch plywood supplied from Wauchope in northern New South Wales, and brush box glulam.

Of the two larger spaces, the Concert Hall is in the western group of shells, the Joan Sutherland Theatre in the eastern group. The scale of the shells was chosen to reflect the internal height requirements, with low entrance spaces, rising over the seating areas up to the high stage towers. The smaller venues (the Drama Theatre, the Playhouse and the Studio) are within the podium, beneath the Concert Hall. A smaller group of shells set to the western side of the Monumental Steps houses the Bennelong Restaurant. The podium is surrounded by substantial open public spaces, and the large stone-paved forecourt area with the adjacent monumental steps is regularly used as a performance space.

Performance venues and facilities

The Sydney Opera House includes a number of performance venues:
 Concert Hall: With 2,679 seats, the home of the Sydney Symphony Orchestra and used by a large number of other concert presenters. It contains the Sydney Opera House Grand Organ, the largest mechanical tracker action organ in the world, with over 10,000 pipes.
 Joan Sutherland Theatre: A proscenium theatre with 1,507 seats, the Sydney home of Opera Australia and The Australian Ballet. Until 17 October 2012 it was known as the Opera Theatre.
 Drama Theatre: A proscenium theatre with 544 seats, used by the Sydney Theatre Company and other dance and theatrical presenters.
 Playhouse: A non-proscenium end-stage theatre with 398 seats.
 Studio: A flexible space with 280 permanent seats (some of which can be folded up) and a maximum capacity of 400, depending on configuration.
 Utzon Room: A small multi-purpose venue for parties, corporate functions and small productions (such as chamber music performances).
 Recording Studio
 Outdoor Forecourt: A flexible open-air venue with a wide range of configuration options, including the possibility of utilising the Monumental Steps as audience seating, used for a range of community events and major outdoor performances.

Other areas (for example the northern and western foyers) are also used for performances on an occasional basis. Venues are also used for conferences, ceremonies and social functions.

Other facilities 
The building also houses a recording studio, retail shops, cafes, restaurants, bars including the Opera Bar and Opera Kitchen. Guided tours are available, including a frequent tour of the front-of-house spaces, and a daily backstage tour that takes visitors backstage to see areas normally reserved for performers and crew members.

History

Construction history

Origins

Planning,began in the late 1940s when Eugene Goossens, the Director of the New South Wales State Conservatorium of Music, lobbied for a suitable venue for large theatrical productions. The normal venue for such productions, the Sydney Town Hall, was not considered large enough. By 1954, Goossens succeeded in gaining the support of New South Wales Premier Joseph Cahill, who called for designs for a dedicated opera house. It was also Goossens who insisted that Bennelong Point be the site: Cahill had wanted it to be on or near Wynyard Railway Station in the northwest of the central business district.

An international design competition was launched by Cahill on 13 September 1955 and received 233 entries, representing architects from 32 countries. The criteria specified a large hall seating 3,000 and a small hall for 1,200 people, each to be designed for different uses, including full-scale operas, orchestral and choral concerts, mass meetings, lectures, ballet performances, and other presentations.

The winner, announced in 1957, was Danish architect Jørn Utzon. Utzon's design was rescued by Finnish-American architect Eero Saarinen from a final cut of 30 rejects. The runner-up was a Philadelphia-based team assembled by Robert Geddes and George Qualls, both teaching at the University of Pennsylvania School of Design. They brought together a band of Penn faculty and friends from Philadelphia architectural offices, including Melvin Brecher, Warren Cunningham, Joseph Marzella, Walter Wiseman, and Leon Loschetter. Geddes, Brecher, Qualls, and Cunningham went on to found the firm GBQC Architects. The grand prize was 5,000 Australian pounds. Utzon visited Sydney in 1957 to help supervise the project. His office moved to Palm Beach, Sydney in February 1963.

Utzon received the Pritzker Architecture Prize, architecture's highest honour, in 2003. The Pritzker Prize citation read:

Design and construction
The Fort Macquarie Tram Depot, occupying the site at the time of these plans, was demolished in 1958 and construction began in March 1959. It was built in four stages: stage I (1957–1959) was planning out the building; stage II (1959–1963) consisted of building the upper podium; stage III (1963–1967) the construction of the outer shells; stage IV (1967–1973) interior design and construction.

Stage I: Podium
Stage I commenced on 2 March 1959 with the construction firm Civil & Civic, monitored by the engineers Ove Arup and Partners. The government had pushed for work to begin early, fearing that funding, or public opinion, might turn against them. However, Utzon had still not completed the final designs. Major structural issues still remained unresolved. By 23 January 1961, work was running 47 weeks behind, mainly because of unexpected difficulties (inclement weather, unexpected difficulty diverting stormwater, construction beginning before proper construction drawings had been prepared, changes of original contract documents). Work on the podium was finally completed in February 1963. The forced early start led to significant later problems, not least of which was the fact that the podium columns were not strong enough to support the roof structure, and had to be re-built.

Stage II: Roof

The shells of the competition entry were originally of undefined geometry, but, early in the design process, the "shells" were perceived as a series of parabolas supported by precast concrete ribs. However, engineers Ove Arup and Partners were unable to find an acceptable solution to constructing them. The formwork for using in-situ concrete would have been prohibitively expensive, and, because there was no repetition in any of the roof forms, the construction of precast concrete for each individual section would possibly have been even more expensive.

From 1957 to 1963, the design team went through at least 12 iterations of the form of the shells trying to find an economically acceptable form (including schemes with parabolas, circular ribs and ellipsoids) before a workable solution was completed. The design work on the shells involved one of the earliest uses of computers in structural analysis, to understand the complex forces to which the shells would be subjected. The computer system was also used in the assembly of the arches. The pins in the arches were surveyed at the end of each day, and the information was entered into the computer so the next arch could be properly placed the following day. In mid-1961, the design team found a solution to the problem: the shells all being created as sections from a sphere. This solution allows arches of varying length to be cast in a common mould, and a number of arch segments of common length to be placed adjacent to one another, to form a spherical section. With whom exactly this solution originated has been the subject of some controversy. It was originally credited to Utzon. Ove Arup's letter to Ashworth, a member of the Sydney Opera House Executive Committee, states: "Utzon came up with an idea of making all the shells of uniform curvature throughout in both directions." Peter Jones, the author of Ove Arup's biography, states that "the architect and his supporters alike claimed to recall the precise eureka moment ...; the engineers and some of their associates, with equal conviction, recall discussion in both central London and at Ove's house."

He goes on to claim that "the existing evidence shows that Arup's canvassed several possibilities for the geometry of the shells, from parabolas to ellipsoids and spheres." Yuzo Mikami, a member of the design team, presents an opposite view in his book on the project, Utzon's Sphere. It is unlikely that the truth will ever be categorically known, but there is a clear consensus that the design team worked very well indeed for the first part of the project and that Utzon, Arup, and Ronald Jenkins (partner of Ove Arup and Partners responsible for the Opera House project) all played a very significant part in the design development.

As Peter Murray states in The Saga of the Sydney Opera House:

The design of the roof was tested on scale models in wind tunnels at University of Southampton and later NPL in order to establish the wind-pressure distribution around the roof shape in very high winds, which helped in the design of the roof tiles and their fixtures.

The immensely complex design and construction of the shells was completed by Hornibrook Group Pty Ltd, who were also responsible for construction in Stage III. Hornibrook manufactured the 2400 precast ribs and 4000 roof panels in an on-site factory and also developed the construction processes. The achievement of this solution avoided the need for expensive formwork construction by allowing the use of precast units and it also allowed the roof tiles to be prefabricated in sheets on the ground, instead of being stuck on individually at height.

The tiles themselves were manufactured by the Swedish company Höganäs Keramik. It took three years of development to produce the effect Utzon wanted in what became known as the Sydney Tile, 120mm square. It is made from clay with a small percentage of crushed stone.

Ove Arup and Partners' site engineer supervised the construction of the shells, which used an innovative adjustable steel-trussed "erection arch" (developed by Hornibrook's engineer Joe Bertony) to support the different roofs before completion. On 6 April 1962, it was estimated that the Opera House would be completed between August 1964 and March 1965.

Stage III: Interiors

Stage III, the interiors, started with Utzon moving his entire office to Sydney in February 1963. However, there was a change of government in 1965, and the new Robert Askin government declared the project under the jurisdiction of the Ministry of Public Works. Due to the Ministry's criticism of the project's costs and time, along with their impression of Utzon's designs being impractical, this ultimately led to his resignation in 1966 (see below).

The cost of the project so far, even in October 1966, was still only A$22.9 million, less than a quarter of the final $102 million cost. However, the projected costs for the design were at this stage much more significant.

The second stage of construction was progressing toward completion when Utzon resigned. His position was principally taken over by Peter Hall, who became largely responsible for the interior design. Other persons appointed that same year to replace Utzon were E. H. Farmer as government architect, D. S. Littlemore and Lionel Todd.

Following Utzon's resignation, the acoustic advisor, Lothar Cremer, confirmed to the Sydney Opera House Executive Committee (SOHEC) that Utzon's original acoustic design allowed for only 2,000 seats in the main hall and further stated that increasing the number of seats to 3,000 as specified in the brief would be disastrous for the acoustics. According to Peter Jones, the stage designer, Martin Carr, criticised the "shape, height and width of the stage, the physical facilities for artists, the location of the dressing rooms, the widths of doors and lifts, and the location of lighting switchboards."

Significant changes to Utzon's design

 The major hall, which was originally to be a multipurpose opera/concert hall, became solely a concert hall, called the Concert Hall. The minor hall, originally for stage productions only, incorporated opera and ballet functions and was called the Opera Theatre, later renamed the Joan Sutherland Theatre. As a result, the Joan Sutherland Theatre is inadequate to stage large-scale opera and ballet. A theatre, a cinema and a library were also added. These were later changed to two live drama theatres and a smaller theatre "in the round". These now comprise the Drama Theatre, the Playhouse and the Studio respectively. These changes were primarily because of inadequacies in the original competition brief, which did not make it adequately clear how the Opera House was to be used. The layout of the interiors was changed, and the stage machinery, already designed and fitted inside the major hall, was pulled out and largely thrown away, as detailed in the 1968 BBC TV documentary Autopsy on a Dream, which "chronicles the full spectrum of controversy surrounding the construction of the Sydney Opera House".
 Externally, the cladding to the podium and the paving (the podium was originally not to be clad down to the water, but to be left open).
 The construction of the glass walls (Utzon was planning to use a system of prefabricated plywood mullions, but a different system was designed to deal with the glass).
 Utzon's plywood corridor designs, and his acoustic and seating designs for the interior of both major halls, were scrapped completely. His design for the Concert Hall was rejected as it only seated 2000, which was considered insufficient. Utzon employed the acoustic consultant Lothar Cremer, and his designs for the major halls were later modelled and found to be very good. The subsequent Todd, Hall and Littlemore versions of both major halls have some problems with acoustics, particularly for the performing musicians. The orchestra pit in the Joan Sutherland Theatre is cramped and dangerous to musicians' hearing. The Concert Hall has a very high roof, leading to a lack of early reflections onstage—perspex rings (the "acoustic clouds") hanging over the stage were added shortly before opening in an (unsuccessful) attempt to address this problem.

Completion and cost
The Opera House was formally completed in 1973, having cost $102 million. H.R. "Sam" Hoare, the Hornibrook director in charge of the project, provided the following approximations in 1973:
Stage I: podium Civil & Civic Pty Ltd approximately $5.5m.
Stage II: roof shells M.R. Hornibrook (NSW) Pty Ltd approximately $12.5m.
Stage III: completion The Hornibrook Group $56.5m.
Separate contracts: stage equipment, stage lighting and organ $9.0m. Fees and other costs: $16.5m.

The original cost and scheduling estimates in 1957 projected a cost of £3,500,000 ($7 million) and completion date of 26 January 1963 (Australia Day). In reality, the project was completed ten years late and 1,357% over budget in real terms.

Strike and Workers' Control 
In 1972, a construction worker was fired, leading the BLF affiliated workers to demand his rehiring and a 25% wage increase. In response to this, all the workers were fired, and in revenge the workers broke into the construction site with a crowbar and brought their own toolboxes. Workers' control was applied to the site for five weeks as the construction workers worked 35 hours a week with improved morale, more efficient organization and fewer people skipping work. The workers agreed to end their work-in when management agreed to give them a 25% wage increase, the right to elect their foremen, four weeks annual leave and a large payment for their troubles.

Utzon and his resignation

Before the Sydney Opera House competition, Jørn Utzon had won seven of the 18 competitions he had entered but had never seen any of his designs built. Utzon's submitted concept for the Sydney Opera House was almost universally admired and considered groundbreaking. The Assessors Report of January 1957 stated:

For the first stage, Utzon worked successfully with the rest of the design team and the client, but, as the project progressed, the Cahill government insisted on progressive revisions. They also did not fully appreciate the costs or work involved in design and construction. Tensions between the client and the design team grew further when an early start to construction was demanded despite an incomplete design. This resulted in a continuing series of delays and setbacks while various technical engineering issues were being refined. The building was unique, and the problems with the design issues and cost increases were exacerbated by commencement of work before the completion of the final plans.

After the 1965 election of the Liberal Party, with Robert Askin becoming Premier of New South Wales, the relationship of client, architect, engineers and contractors became increasingly tense. Askin had been a "vocal critic of the project prior to gaining office." His new Minister for Public Works, Davis Hughes, was even less sympathetic. Elizabeth Farrelly, an Australian architecture critic, wrote that:

Differences ensued. One of the first was that Utzon believed the clients should receive information on all aspects of the design and construction through his practice, while the clients wanted a system (notably drawn in sketch form by Davis Hughes) where architect, contractors, and engineers each reported to the client directly and separately. This had great implications for procurement methods and cost control, with Utzon wishing to negotiate contracts with chosen suppliers (such as Ralph Symonds for the plywood interiors) and the New South Wales government insisting contracts be put out to tender.

Utzon was highly reluctant to respond to questions or criticism from the client's Sydney Opera House Executive Committee (SOHEC). However, he was greatly supported throughout by a member of the committee and one of the original competition judges, Harry Ingham Ashworth. Utzon was unwilling to compromise on some aspects of his designs that the clients wanted to change.

Utzon's ability was never in doubt, despite questions raised by Davis Hughes, who attempted to portray Utzon as an impractical dreamer. Ove Arup actually stated that Utzon was "probably the best of any I have come across in my long experience of working with architects" and: "The Opera House could become the world's foremost contemporary masterpiece if Utzon is given his head."

In October 1965, Utzon gave Hughes a schedule setting out the completion dates of parts of his work for stage III. Utzon was at this time working closely with Ralph Symonds, a manufacturer of plywood based in Sydney and highly regarded by many, despite an Arup engineer warning that Ralph Symonds's "knowledge of the design stresses of plywood was extremely sketchy" and that the technical advice was "elementary to say the least and completely useless for our purposes." Australian architecture critic Elizabeth Farrelly has referred to Ove Arup's project engineer Michael Lewis as having "other agendas". In any case, Hughes shortly after withheld permission for the construction of plywood prototypes for the interiors, and the relationship between Utzon and the client never recovered. By February 1966, Utzon was owed more than $100,000 in fees. Hughes then withheld funding so that Utzon could not even pay his own staff. The government minutes record that following several threats of resignation, Utzon finally stated to Davis Hughes: "If you don't do it, I resign." Hughes replied: "I accept your resignation. Thank you very much. Goodbye."

Utzon left the project on 28 February 1966. He said that Hughes's refusal to pay him any fees and the lack of collaboration caused his resignation and later described the situation as "Malice in Blunderland". In March 1966, Hughes offered him a subordinate role as "design architect" under a panel of executive architects, without any supervisory powers over the House's construction, but Utzon rejected this. Utzon left the country never to return.

Following the resignation, there was great controversy about who was in the right and who was in the wrong. The Sydney Morning Herald initially opined: "No architect in the world has enjoyed greater freedom than Mr Utzon. Few clients have been more patient or more generous than the people and the Government of NSW. One would not like history to record that this partnership was brought to an end by a fit of temper on the one side or by a fit of meanness on the other." On 17 March 1966, the Herald offered the view that: "It was not his [Utzon's] fault that a succession of Governments and the Opera House Trust should so signally have failed to impose any control or order on the project ... his concept was so daring that he himself could solve its problems only step by step ... his insistence on perfection led him to alter his design as he went along."

The Sydney Opera House opened the way for the immensely complex geometries of some modern architecture. The design was one of the first examples of the use of computer-aided design to design complex shapes. The design techniques developed by Utzon and Arup for the Sydney Opera House have been further developed and are now used for architecture, such as works of Gehry and blobitecture, as well as most reinforced concrete structures. The design is also one of the first in the world to use araldite to glue the precast structural elements together and proved the concept for future use.

It was also a first in mechanical engineering.

Opening

The Sydney Opera House was formally opened by Queen Elizabeth II, on 20 October 1973. A large crowd attended. Utzon was not invited to the ceremony, nor was his name mentioned. The opening was televised and included fireworks and a performance of Beethoven's Symphony No. 9.

Reconciliation with Utzon; building refurbishment
In the late 1990s, the Sydney Opera House Trust resumed communication with Utzon in an attempt to effect a reconciliation and to secure his involvement in future changes to the building. In 1999, he was appointed by the trust as a design consultant for future work.

In 2004, the first interior space rebuilt to an Utzon design was opened and renamed "The Utzon Room" in his honour. It contains an original Utzon tapestry (14.00 x 3.70 metres) called Homage to Carl Philipp Emanuel Bach. In April 2007, he proposed a major reconstruction of the Opera Theatre, as it was then known. Utzon died on 29 November 2008.

A state memorial service, attended by Utzon's son Jan and daughter Lin, was held in the Concert Hall on 25 March 2009 featuring performances, readings and recollections from prominent figures in the Australian performing arts scene.

Refurbished Western Foyer and accessibility improvements were commissioned on 17 November 2009, the largest building project completed since Utzon was re-engaged in 1999. Designed by Utzon and his son Jan, the project provided improved ticketing, toilet and cloaking facilities. New escalators and a public lift enabled enhanced access for the disabled and families with prams. The prominent paralympian athlete Louise Sauvage was announced as the building's "accessibility ambassador" to advise on further improvements to aid people with disabilities.

In 2013, a 60 metre long artwork by artist Reg Mombassa was unveiled at the Sydney Opera House. The Gumscape, Road and Creatures triptych was commissioned by the Sydney Opera House to cover the scaffolding concealing refurbishment building work. 

On 29 March 2016, an original 1959 tapestry by Le Corbusier (2.18 x 3.55 metres), commissioned by Utzon to be hung in the Sydney Opera House and called Les Dés Sont Jetés (The Dice Are Cast), was finally unveiled in situ after being owned by the Utzon family and held at their home in Denmark for over 50 years. The tapestry was bought at auction by the Sydney Opera House in June 2015. It now hangs in the building's Western Foyer and is accessible to the public.

In the second half of 2017, the Joan Sutherland Theatre was closed to replace the stage machinery and for other works.

Architectural design role of Peter Hall
After the resignation of Utzon, the Minister for Public Works, Davis Hughes, and the Government Architect, Ted Farmer, organised a team to bring the Sydney Opera House to completion. The architectural work was divided between three appointees who became the Hall, Todd, Littlemore partnership. David Littlemore would manage construction supervision, Lionel Todd contract documentation, while the crucial role of design became the responsibility of Peter Hall.

Peter Hall (1931–1995) completed a combined arts and architecture degree at Sydney University. Upon graduation a travel scholarship enabled him to spend twelve months in Europe during which time he visited Utzon in Hellebæk. Returning to Sydney, Hall worked for the Government Architect, a branch of the NSW Public Works Department. While there he established himself as a talented design architect with a number of court and university buildings, including the Goldstein Hall at the University of New South Wales, which won the Sir John Sulman Medal in 1964.

Hall resigned from the Government Architects office in early 1966 to pursue his own practice. When approached to take on the design role, (after at least two prominent Sydney architects had declined), Hall spoke with Utzon by phone before accepting the position. Utzon reportedly told Hall: he (Hall) would not be able to finish the job and the Government would have to invite him back. Hall also sought the advice of others, including architect Don Gazzard who warned him acceptance would be a bad career move as the project would "never be his own".

Hall agreed to accept the role on the condition there was no possibility of Utzon returning. Even so, his appointment did not go down well with many of his fellow architects who considered that no one but Utzon should complete the Sydney Opera House. Upon Utzon's dismissal, a rally of protest had marched to Bennelong Point. A petition was also circulated, including in the Government Architects office. Peter Hall was one of the many who had signed the petition that called for Utzon's reinstatement.

When Hall agreed to the design role and was appointed in April 1966, he imagined he would find the design and documentation for the Stage III well advanced. What he found was an enormous amount of work ahead of him with many aspects completely unresolved by Utzon in relation to seating capacity, acoustics and structure. In addition Hall found the project had proceeded for nine years without the development of a concise client brief. To bring himself up to speed, Hall investigated concert and opera venues overseas and engaged stage consultant Ben Schlange and acoustic consultant Wilhelm Jordan, while establishing his team. In consultation with all the potential building users, the first Review of Program was completed in January 1967. The most significant conclusion reached by Hall was that concert and opera were incompatible in the same hall. Although Utzon had sketched ideas using plywood for the great enclosing glass walls, their structural viability was unresolved when Hall took on the design role. With the ability to delegate tasks and effectively coordinate the work of consultants, Hall guided the project for over five years until the opening day in 1973.

A former Government Architect, Peter Webber, in his book Peter Hall: the Phantom of the Opera House, concludes: when Utzon resigned no one was better qualified (than Hall) to rise to the challenge of completing the design of the Opera House.

Performance firsts
During the construction phase, lunchtime performances were often arranged for the workers, with American vocalist Paul Robeson the first artist to perform, in 1960.

Various performances were presented prior to the official opening:
 The first solo piano recital was in the Concert Hall on 10 April 1973, played by Romola Costantino to an invited audience.
 The first opera performed was Sergei Prokofiev's War and Peace, in what was then known as the Opera Theatre on 28 September 1973, conducted by the Australian Opera's Music Director, Edward Downes. (It had been intended that Peter Sculthorpe's work Rites of Passage would have this honour, but it was not ready on time. Rites of Passage was premiered almost exactly a year later, on 27 September 1974.)
 The first evening performance of an opera was Larry Sitsky's The Fall of the House of Usher, conducted by Rex Hobcroft and paired with Dalgerie by James Penberthy, to a libretto by Mary Durack; it took place on 25 July 1973.
 The first public concert in the Concert Hall took place on 29 September 1973. It was an all-Wagner orchestral concert performed by the Sydney Symphony Orchestra, conducted by Charles Mackerras and with Birgit Nilsson as the soprano soloist. The first music played was the Prelude to Die Meistersinger von Nürnberg. The concert closed with the Immolation Scene from Götterdämmerung.

After the opening:
 The first violin and piano recital was given by Wanda Wiłkomirska, with pianist Geoffrey Parsons.

Public and commemorative events

In 1993, Constantine Koukias was commissioned by the Sydney Opera House Trust in association with REM Theatre to compose Icon, a large-scale music theatre piece for the 20th anniversary of the Sydney Opera House.

During the 2000 Summer Olympics, the venue served as the focal point for the triathlon events. The event had a  swimming loop at Farm Cove, along with competitions in the neighbouring Royal Botanical Gardens for the cycling and running portions of the event.

Since 2013, a group of residents from the nearby Bennelong Apartments (better known as 'The Toaster'), calling themselves the Sydney Opera House Concerned Citizens Group, have been campaigning against Forecourt Concerts on the grounds that they exceed noise levels outlined in the development approval (DA). In February 2017 the NSW Department of Planning and the Environment handed down a $15,000 fine to the Sydney Opera House for breach of allowed noise levels at a concert held in November 2015. However, the DA was amended in 2016 to allow an increase in noise levels in the forecourt by 5 decibels. The residents opposing the concerts contend that a new DA should have been filed rather than an amendment.

The Sydney Opera House sails formed a graphic projection-screen in a lightshow mounted in connection with the International Fleet Review in Sydney Harbour on 5 October 2013.

On 31 December 2013, the venue's 40th anniversary year, a New Year fireworks display was mounted for the first time in a decade. The Sydney Opera House hosted an event, 'the biggest blind date' on Friday 21 February 2014 that won an historic Guinness World Record. The longest continuous serving employee was commemorated on 27 June 2018, for 50 years of service.

On 14 June 2019, a state memorial service for former Australian Prime Minister Bob Hawke was held at the Sydney Opera House.

Advertising controversy
On 5 October 2018 the Opera House chief executive Louise Herron clashed with Sydney radio commentator Alan Jones, who called for her sacking for refusing to allow Racing NSW to use the Opera House sails to advertise The Everest horse race. Within hours, NSW Premier Gladys Berejiklian overruled Herron. Two days later, Prime Minister Scott Morrison supported the decision, calling the Opera House "the biggest billboard Sydney has". The NSW Labor Party leader, Luke Foley, and senior federal Labor frontbencher Anthony Albanese had supported the proposal. The political view was not supported by significant public opinion, with a petition against the advertising collecting over 298,000 names by 9 October 2018. 235,000 printed petition documents were presented to the NSW Parliament in the morning. A survey conducted on 8 October by market research firm Micromex found that 81% of those surveyed were not supportive of the premier's direction.

Notable performances

 1960 – The first person to perform at the Sydney Opera House was Paul Robeson – he sang "Ol' Man River" to the construction workers as they ate lunch.
 1973 – Sergei Prokofiev's War and Peace, on 28 September 1973.
 1973 – Opening gala concert in the concert hall with music by Richard Wagner. Sydney Symphony Orchestra conducted by Sir Charles Mackerras. Soloist: The great Swedish soprano Birgit Nilsson, on 29 September 1973.
 1973 – The Carol Burnett Show performed comedy sketches, song and dance; including Tim Conway as the world's oldest conductor.
 1974 – Opera singer Joan Sutherland performed for the first time in the theatre that would be named for her.
 1978 – Irish rockers Thin Lizzy (played a free concert on the steps) and was brought out on the record Thin Lizzy Live at Sydney Harbour '78.
 1985 – Ray Lawler's classic Doll Trilogy.
 1987 – Pope John Paul II gave a speech in the Concert Hall during his visit to Australia.
 1990 – Nelson Mandela addressed a crowd of 40,000 and attended a choral performance of Nkosi Sikelel’ iAfrica ("God Bless Africa").
 1991 – Joan Sutherland gives her final performance.
 1995 – Bernard Shaw's Saint Joan: starring Jacqueline McKenzie in the title role of Joan of Arc.
 1996 – Crowded House played their record-breaking Farewell to the World concert on the steps.
 2000 – Swimmer Samantha Riley stands on top of one of the Concert Hall's shells with the Olympic Torch, before sending the flame on its final journey to light the cauldron at Stadium Australia.
 2003 – Pulitzer Prize winning play Proof by David Auburn, starring Jacqueline McKenzie and Barry Otto.
 2004 – Canadian singer Michael Bublé performed in the Concert Hall.
 2008 – Premiere performance of "Angels in the Architecture" by Frank Ticheli, a wind band composition inspired by the opera house itself. Conducted by Matthew George. 
 2009 – First VIVID Live Music program curated by Brian Eno.
 2011 – Oprah Winfrey filmed her Ultimate Australian Adventure in the forecourt.
 2020 – First Six performance in Australia was held in The Studio theatre, making it one of the first hit musical performances in The Studio theatre.

Awards
 RAIA Merit Award, 1974.
 Meritorious Lighting Award of the Illuminating Engineering Society of Australia, 1974.
 RAIA Civic Design Award, 1980.
 RAIA Commemorative Award, Jørn Utzon – Sydney Opera House, 1992.

Cultural references
 
The Opera House (often along with the nearby Sydney Harbour Bridge), is frequently used in establishing shots for films and television to identify the setting as Sydney and/or Australia.
 The Sydney Opera House appeared on the cover of the Phoenix Force adventure novel Down Under Thunder in 1986.
 The Sydney Opera House appeared in the 1990 Disney animated film The Rescuers Down Under.
 In the 1991 season 5, episode 5 of Inspector Morse, titled "Promised Land", Morse climbs the steps at the end of the episode to attend an opera performance.
 Near the end of the 1996 film Independence Day, the Sydney Opera House appeared after an alien ship near Sydney was destroyed.
 The Sydney Opera House appeared in the 2003 Disney/Pixar animated film Finding Nemo.
 The Sydney Opera House featured in the 2004 Godzilla movie, Godzilla Final Wars, in which the titular character dispatched an enemy, Zilla, destroying the famous landmark in the process.
 The Sydney Opera House appeared in the final scene of 2007 film Sunshine, directed by Danny Boyle.
 In Better Call Saul, the father of Werner Ziegler, a German engineer who helped build Gus Fring's drug laboratory, had reportedly worked on the construction of the Sydney Opera House.
 The Opera House appeared during the closing credits of the 2011 film Cars 2, in which the building's podium was modelled on the front of a Holden FC.
In the 2013 video game SimCity the building is featured as a placeable landmark building.
 In the 2016 superhero film X-Men: Apocalypse, the building and other parts of Sydney are destroyed when Magneto manipulates the Earth's magnetic poles.
 In the 2016 4X video game Civilization VI, the Opera House is a constructible Atomic Era wonder which grants bonuses to a civilization's cultural output and points toward earning musicians.
 The Nintendo Switch video game Mario Kart 8 Deluxe had a "Booster Course Pass" downloadable content release in 2022, which included the 2019 Mario Kart Tour track Sydney Sprint. The track features the Opera House exteriors and ring-era concert hall interiors.

See also

 Auditorio de Tenerife – a modern structure in Canary Islands, Spain with a similar design
 Australian landmarks
 Clyde Auditorium – a modern structure in Scotland with a visually similar design
 List of official openings by Elizabeth II in Australia
 Lotus Temple – a modern structure in India with a similar design
 Man O'War Steps
 Wonders of the World
 Mathematics and art

References

Attribution
 This Wikipedia article contains material from Sydney Opera House, listed on the "New South Wales State Heritage Register" published by the Government of New South Wales under CC-BY 3.0 AU licence (accessed on 3 September 2017).

Bibliography

 Drew, Philip, "The Masterpiece: Jørn Utzon: a secret life", Hardie Grant Books, 1999, .
 Duek-Cohen, Elias, Utzon and the Sydney Opera House, Morgan Publications, Sydney, 1967–1998. (A small publication intended to gather public opinion to bring Utzon back to the project.)
 Hubble, Ava, The Strange Case of Eugene Goossens and Other Tales from The Opera House, Collins Publishers, Australia, 1988. (Ava Hubble was Press Officer for the Sydney Opera House for 15 years.)
 Opera House an architectural "tragedy", ABC News Online, 28 April 2005.
 Murray, Peter "The Saga of Sydney Opera House: The Dramatic Story of the Design and Construction of the Icon of Modern Australia", Publisher Taylor & Francis, 2004, 9780415325226

 Stübe, Katarina and Utzon, Jan, Sydney Opera House: A Tribute to Jørn Utzon. Reveal Books, 2009. 
 Stuber, Fritz, "Sydney's Opera House—Not a World Heritage Item? – Open letter to the Hon. John W. Howard, Prime Minister", in: Australian Planner (Sydney), Vol. 35, No. 3, 1998 (p. 116); Architecture + Design (New Delhi), Vol. XV, No. 5, 1998 (pp. 12–14); Collage (Berne), No. 3, 1998, (pp. 33–34, 1 ill.).
 Watson, Anne (editor), "Building a Masterpiece: The Sydney Opera House", Lund Humphries, 2006, .

 Webber, Peter, "Peter Hall: The Phantom of the Opera House", The Watermark Press, 2012, .
 Woolley, Ken, Reviewing the performance: the design of the Sydney Opera House, The Watermark Press, 2010, .

Archival holdings

 NRS 12825 – Competition drawings submitted by Jørn Utzon to the Opera House Committee, 1956. Held by New South Wales State Archives and Records.

External links

 
 ABC, The Opera House Project
 World heritage listing for Sydney Opera House At unesco.org, 2007
 Photographs of the construction
 Competition drawings submitted by Jørn Utzon to the Opera House Committee
 Wolanski Foundation's annotated bibliography of sources on Sydney Opera House
 Architect Matt Taylor's response to the building
 Listen to an excerpt from the 'Sydney Opera House Opening Concert' and read more about it on Australian screen online
 The Edge of the Possible Documentary film with Jørn Utzon at filmartmedia.com, 21 September 2011
 Autopsy On a Dream – the making of the Sydney Opera House at ABC Arts News 17 October 2013
 Timeline: 40 years of the Sydney Opera House at ABC News 22 October 2013
  [CC-By-SA]. Includes 'Sydney Opera House' by Laila Ellmoos, 2008 and 'Utzon's Opera House' by Eoghan Lewis, 2014.
 Sydney Opera House at Google Cultural Institute
 LIFE Magazine Jan. 6, 1967 article about its construction
 Archives reveal more history of Hornibrook innovation in the building of Sydney Opera House, 2021, Julie Hornibrook, John Oxley Library Blog, State Library of Queensland.

 
Music venues in Sydney
Ballet venues
Concert halls in Australia
Opera houses in Australia
Theatres in Sydney
Landmarks in Sydney
Tourist attractions in Sydney
Music venues completed in 1973
Theatres completed in 1973
1973 establishments in Australia
Mathematics and art
Venues of the 2000 Summer Olympics
Olympic triathlon venues
Sydney New Year's Eve
Australian National Heritage List
Jørn Utzon buildings
Ove Arup buildings and structures
Concrete shell structures
Expressionist architecture
Modernist architecture in Australia
New South Wales State Heritage Register sites located in the Sydney central business district
Buildings and structures awarded the Sir John Sulman Medal
World Heritage Sites in New South Wales